A breath is the act of inhaling and exhaling.

Breath might also refer to:

 Breath (play), a play by Samuel Beckett
 Breath (2007 film), a 2007 film
 Breath (2009 film), a 2009 film
 Breath (2016 film), a 2016 film
 Breath (2017 film), a 2017 film based on the novel of the same name by Tim Winton
 Breath: The New Science of a Lost Art, a 2020 book by James Nestor
 Breath (novel), by Tim Winton
 "Breath" (Breaking Benjamin song), a song from the album Phobia
 "Breath" (Pearl Jam song), a song from the soundtrack album, Singles
 "Breath", a song by the Swollen Members featuring Nelly Furtado from the album Monsters in the Closet
 The album SM the Ballad Vol. 2 – Breath, as well as its title song "Breath".

See also 

 Breathe (disambiguation) 
 Breathing